Radio Usora is a Bosnian local public radio station, broadcasting from Usora, Bosnia and Herzegovina.

It was launched on 5 June 1992 as Radio postaja Usora.

Since August 1, 2002, radio station has been registered as a public company J.P. „Radio Usora“ d.o.o. under the current name Radio Usora.

This radio station broadcasts a variety of programs such as music, talk shows and local news. Program is mainly produced in Croatian. Estimated number of potential listeners of Radio Usora is around 168.815

The radio station is available in municipalities of Zenica-Doboj Canton and via IPTV platform Moja TV (Channel 185).

Frequencies
The program is currently broadcast at one frequency.

 Usora

See also 
 List of radio stations in Bosnia and Herzegovina
 Radio Zenica 
 Radio Doboj

References

External links 
 Facebook page of Radio Usora
 www.fmscan.org
 www.radiostanica.ba
 Communications Regulatory Agency of Bosnia and Herzegovina

Usora
Radio stations established in 1992
Radio stations established in 2002